Leptepistomion is a monotypic moth genus in the family Geometridae described by Wehrli in 1936. Its only species, Leptepistomion concinna, was first described by Warren in 1894. It is found in Tibet.

References

Geometridae
Monotypic moth genera